Leonard G. Barrie (born June 4, 1969) is a Canadian former professional ice hockey forward who played 184 games in the National Hockey League. 

He played for the Philadelphia Flyers, Pittsburgh Penguins, Los Angeles Kings, and Florida Panthers. He was a co-owner of the Tampa Bay Lightning, and was the president and coach of the Victoria Grizzlies of the British Columbia Hockey League.

Post-playing career

Tampa Bay Lightning
On June 18, 2008, the NHL Board of Governors approved the sale of the Tampa Bay Lightning to an investment group which included Barrie and movie producer Oren Koules.

It was alleged that Barrie and Koules began to disagree on team management issues, that were believed to include NHL superstar Vincent Lecavalier being traded. This became such a problem that NHL Commissioner Gary Bettman had to intervene and have a meeting with the two owners. Both were given the opportunity to buy the other out. Neither exercised that option and the team was later sold to Jeff Vinik, a minority owner of the Boston Red Sox.

Bear Mountain
Barrie was a real estate & resort developer in the Victoria, British Columbia area. At one time he was the major partner in the Bear Mountain Resort development in Langford municipality. Bear Mountain includes the Bear Mountain Westin Hotel, golf course, and housing (single-family homes and condominiums).

The development of Bear Mountain resort has been criticized for damaging sensitive ecosystems and historic native sites.

In 2012, Barrie was the target of numerous legal actions and eventually parted from the Bear Mountain ownership group.  At the same time, Barrie declared bankruptcy and had to give up his Langford home.  Bear Mountain currently has a new management team after being under court protection from creditors.

Personal life
Barrie's son, Tyson, followed in his footsteps and currently plays for the Nashville Predators of the National Hockey League.

Career statistics

Awards
 WHL West First All-Star Team – 1990

References

External links
 

1969 births
Calgary Wranglers (WHL) players
Canadian ice hockey centres
Edmonton Oilers draft picks
Florida Panthers players
Hershey Bears players
Ice hockey people from British Columbia
Kamloops Blazers players
Living people
Los Angeles Kings players
National Hockey League executives
National Hockey League owners
People from the Regional District of East Kootenay
Philadelphia Flyers players
Pittsburgh Penguins players
Tampa Bay Lightning executives
Victoria Cougars (WHL) players